Tim Burns is a Canadian writer and producer for Canadian and American television; more popularly known as the show runner/executive producer of the Teletoon-Disney Channel shared, supernatural comedy-drama series, My Babysitter's a Vampire and for writing its TV pilot film. He was also supervising writer of the third season of  Crank Yankers and was a composer on The Sunny Side Up Show.

Career
Tim Burns began his writing career in 1985 with the CBC radio comedy series The Norm Show, and in 1989 was hired as a staff writer on The Jim Henson Hour.  He also wrote the 1 hour special Dog City which was later developed into an animated series.   During pre-production of the Henson Hour, he met Tom Stern and a few years later they and Stern's writing partner Alex Winter created the sketch comedy series The Idiot Box. Burns also dabbled in CGI and created the animated character 'Votar - The Voice Over Announcer of the Future" on his Amiga computer.  The trio collaborated again on the screenplay for the movie Freaked, in which Burns played the Hideous Frogman, and also wrote the soundtrack tunes "Wienerschnitzel Polka", "Pick-A-Freek", and "Freekz!" That's What They Call Us!.  Stern and Burns wrote many Monkeyed Movies parodies for the TBS network, which evolved into the half-hour comedy series, The Chimp Channel".  Returning to Canada in 2000, Tim served as supervising producer for the second season of the Blackfly wrote two episodes.

Having started out as a drummer in a new-wave band 'The Strone', Burns began composing in 1996 with Hello Mrs. Cherrywinkle, and other shows like The Good Night Show, Saul of the Mole Men, and The Sunny Side Up Show from 2007 until 2009. He also worked on soundtracks for  Young Person's Guide to History. Burns wrote an episode of Star Wars: The Clone Wars in 2008, "Destroy Malevolence". In 2010 he wrote the teleplay and story for the Teletoon TV movie, My Babysitter's a Vampire, when the movie became a series, he became executive producer of the series and wrote the series premiere episode along with two other episodes.

More recently, Burns has contributed music and comedy sketches for the Netflix special, Kevin Hart's Guide to Black History, and composed music for numerous songs, including the theme, to the Universal Kids' stop-motion animated series Norman Picklestripes''.   He continues to develop new comedy and music material for film and television in both Canada and the U.S.

Filmography

External links

Living people
Year of birth missing (living people)
20th-century Canadian screenwriters
21st-century Canadian screenwriters
Canadian male screenwriters
Canadian television writers
Canadian comedy writers
20th-century Canadian male writers
21st-century Canadian male writers
Canadian Comedy Award winners